Wami or WAMI may refer to:

 the Wami River in Tanzania
Battle of Wami, World War I battle fought near the river
Wami Bridge, a bridge crossing the river
 Gete Wami (born 1974), Ethiopian long-distance runner and Olympic medallist
 Mulugeta Wami (born 1982), Ethiopian marathon runner
 West African Monetary Institute, the implementing body of the West African Monetary Zone
Caecum wami, a species of minute sea snail
Umshini wami, a Zulu language "struggle song"
Wide-area motion imagery
ICAO code for Sultan Bantilan Airport
 Wami Taksar, town in Nepal

Music and media
 WAMI (AM), a radio station (860 AM) licensed to Opp, Alabama, United States
 WAMI-FM, a radio station (102.3 FM) licensed to Opp, Alabama, United States
 WAMI-TV, a television station (channel 24, virtual 69) licensed to Hollywood, Florida, United States
 West Australian Music Industry Awards
 Wisconsin Area Music Industry